Pomatosace is a genus of flowering plant in the family Primulaceae, with only one species, Pomatosace filicula, endemic to the Qinghai–Tibetan Plateau in China.

Description

Distribution and ecology
Pomatosace filicula is only found in the north-eastern part of the Qinghai–Tibetan Plateau, in the Chinese provinces of Sichuan, Xizang (Tibet) and Qinghai. It flowers from May to June, and fruits from June to August. It is thought to have evolved to inhabit the open ground in front of the burrows of plateau pikas (Ochotona curzoniae) and other ground-dwelling mammals.

Taxonomy
Pomatosace filicula is the only species in the genus Pomatosace, as described by Karl Maximovich in 1881. More recent molecular phylogenetic data have shown, however, that Pomatosace is nested within Androsace, meaning that some taxonomic change is required to maintain monophyletic genera – either sinking Pomatosace into Androsace or splitting Androsace into a number of genera.

References

External links
Original description by Maximovicz

Primulaceae
Alpine flora
Flora of Qinghai
Flora of Sichuan
Flora of Tibet
Monotypic Ericales genera
Primulaceae genera